Lost in Translation is a 2003 romantic comedy-drama film written and directed by Sofia Coppola. Bill Murray stars as Bob Harris, a fading American movie star who is having a midlife crisis when he travels to Tokyo to promote Suntory whisky. There, he befriends another estranged American named Charlotte, a young woman and recent college graduate played by Scarlett Johansson. Giovanni Ribisi and Anna Faris also feature. The film explores themes of alienation and disconnection against a backdrop of cultural displacement in Japan. Further analysis by critics and scholars has focused on the film's defiance of mainstream narrative conventions and its atypical depiction of romance.

Coppola started writing the film after spending time in Tokyo and becoming fond of the city. She began forming a story about two characters experiencing a "romantic melancholy" in the Park Hyatt Tokyo, where she stayed while promoting her first feature film, the 1999 drama The Virgin Suicides. Coppola envisioned Murray playing the role of Bob Harris from the beginning and tried to recruit him for up to a year, relentlessly sending him telephone messages and letters. While Murray eventually agreed to play the part, he did not sign a contract; Coppola spent a quarter of the film's $4 million budget without knowing if he would actually appear for shooting. When Murray finally arrived, Coppola described feelings of significant relief.

Principal photography began on September 29, 2002, and lasted 27 days. Coppola kept a flexible schedule during filming with a small crew and minimal equipment. The screenplay was short and Coppola often allowed a significant amount of improvisation during filming. The film's director of photography, Lance Acord, used available light as often as possible and many Japanese places of business and public areas were used as locations for shooting. After 10 weeks of editing, Coppola sold distribution rights for the United States and Canada to Focus Features, and the company promoted the film by generating positive word of mouth before its theatrical release.

Lost in Translation premiered on August 29, 2003, at the Telluride Film Festival on September 12, 2003 to major critical and commercial success. Critics praised the performances of Murray and Johansson, as well as the writing and direction of Coppola; minor criticism was given to the film's depiction of Japan. At the 76th Academy Awards, Lost in Translation won Coppola Best Original Screenplay, and the film was also nominated for Best Picture, Best Director (Coppola), and Best Actor (Murray). Other accolades won include three Golden Globe Awards and three British Academy Film Awards.

Plot
Bob Harris is a fading American movie star who arrives in Tokyo to appear in lucrative advertisements for Suntory whisky. He stays at the upscale Park Hyatt Tokyo and is miserable due to problems within his 25-year marriage and a midlife crisis. Charlotte, another American staying at the hotel, is a young Yale graduate in philosophy who is accompanying her husband John while he works as a celebrity photographer. Charlotte is feeling similarly disenchanted as she questions her marriage and is anxious about her future. They both struggle with additional bouts of jet lag and culture shock in Tokyo and pass the time loitering around the hotel.

Charlotte is repelled by a vacuous Hollywood actress named Kelly, who is also at the hotel promoting a film. She bumps into Charlotte and John, gushing over photography sessions she has previously done with him. Bob and Charlotte frequently cross paths in the hotel and eventually introduce themselves to each other in the hotel bar.

After several encounters, when John is on assignment outside Tokyo, Charlotte invites Bob into the city to meet some local friends. They bond over an evening in Tokyo, where they experience the city nightlife together. In the days that follow, Bob and Charlotte spend more time together, and their friendship strengthens. One night, while neither can sleep, the two share an intimate conversation about Charlotte's personal uncertainties and their married lives.

Bob spends the night with a jazz singer from the hotel bar on the penultimate night of his stay and Charlotte hears the woman singing in Bob's room the next morning, leading to tension between Bob and Charlotte during lunch together later that day. The pair re-encounter each other in the evening and Bob reveals that he will be leaving Tokyo the following day.

Bob and Charlotte reconcile and express how they will miss each other, making a final visit to the hotel bar. The next morning, when Bob is leaving the hotel, he and Charlotte share sincere but unsatisfactory goodbyes. On Bob's taxi ride to the airport, he sees Charlotte on a crowded street, stops the car, and walks to her. He then embraces her and whispers something in her ear. The two share a kiss and say goodbye before Bob departs.

Cast
 Bill Murray as Bob Harris, a fading movie star
 Scarlett Johansson as Charlotte, a recent college graduate
 Giovanni Ribisi as John, Charlotte's husband, a celebrity photographer
 Anna Faris as Kelly, a Hollywood actress
 Fumihiro Hayashi as Charlie, Charlotte's friend
 Catherine Lambert as a jazz singer

Analysis

Themes

The film's writer-director, Sofia Coppola, has described Lost in Translation as a story about "things being disconnected and looking for moments of connection", a perspective that has been shared by critics and scholars. In a cultural sense, Bob and Charlotte are disoriented by feelings of jet lag and culture shock as a result of foreign travel to Japan. Bob is bewildered by his interactions with a Japanese commercial director whom he cannot understand, realizing that the meaning of his communication is "lost in translation" by an interpreter. Moreover, both are sleepless from a change in time zone, choosing to cope with their wakefulness by making late-night visits to the hotel bar. Such feelings provoke a sense of estrangement from their environment, but they also exacerbate deeper experiences of alienation and disconnection in their lives. Bob and Charlotte are both in troubled marriages and facing similar crises of identity; Charlotte is unsure of what to do with her life and questions what role she should embrace in the world, while Bob is invariably reminded of his fading stature as a movie star and feels disassociated from the identity by which he is already defined.

Such experiences are heightened by the characters' contact with the city environment of Tokyo; Bob feels alienated by seeing his likeness used in an advertisement while he is driven from the airport to his hotel, and the colorful cityscape is rendered as a frenetic environment by which he is overwhelmed. Charlotte feels adrift as she attempts to find meaning while wandering Tokyo, and feels isolated as she peers over the city from her hotel room window. The Park Hyatt Tokyo offers hermetic qualities that insulate the characters from the city and is the site Bob chooses to seek refuge from his ails. These shared impressions of alienation create common ground for Bob and Charlotte to cultivate a personal connection. When Charlotte invites Bob to experience the Tokyo nightlife, she reduces his sense of distance from the city and the two develop a connection based on small moments together. In the little time they have together, each realize they are not alone in seeking a sense of something deeper in their lives. Coppola, speaking about the brief nature of their encounter, remarked, "For everyone, there are those moments when you have great days with someone you wouldn't expect to. Then you have to go back to your real lives, but it makes an impression on you. It's what makes it so great and enjoyable."

Geoff King, a scholar who wrote a book about the film, comments that the experiences of the central characters are one factor that lends Lost in Translation to varied interpretations by academics. Todd McGowan reads the film from a Lacanian psychoanalytic perspective, arguing that the film encourages the embrace of "absence" in one's life and relationships. He describes Coppola's depiction of Tokyo "as a city bubbling over with excess", which offers an empty promise of gratification. In his view, both Bob and Charlotte recognize that they cannot find meaning in Tokyo's attractions, so they bond over their shared sense of emptiness in them. Lucy Bolton offers a feminist reading, arguing that Lost in Translation evokes the thought of feminist philosopher Luce Irigaray by highlighting issues of young womanhood. She argues that the film provides a complex portrait of Charlotte's female subjectivity and an optimistic rendering of the character's pursuit for individual expression.

Narrative
Lost in Translation has been broadly examined in terms of its narrative structure, with commentators noting that it contains few plot events as compared with films in the Hollywood mainstream. Narrative events are mostly focused on the development of Bob and Charlotte's relationship, with few "external" obstacles that impact the central characters. King notes, "More time is taken to evoke the impressions, feelings, and experiences of the central characters", which represents "a shift in the hierarchical arrangement of [film elements]" that prioritizes character experiences over plot. The literary critic Steve Vineberg argues that "the links of the story are indeed there, only they're not typical cause-and-effect connections. They're formed by the emotions that gather at the end of one episode and pour into the next". King maintains that while the plot does progress according to a basic linear causality, "If the episodic quality often seems to the fore, this is partly a matter of the pacing of individual sequences that are very often leisurely and dedicated to the establishment or development of mood and atmospherics". Coppola said she wanted the story to emphasize the qualities of an intimate moment, and she did not want to impose grandiose narrative devices on the characters such as "a war keeping them apart".

The film's opening shot has been another point of discussion among critics and scholars. The 36-second shot, which features Charlotte's backside as she lies on a bed wearing transparent pink panties, is based on the photorealist paintings of John Kacere and has often been compared to the initial appearance of Brigitte Bardot in the 1963 film Contempt. While some have described it as a foreshadowing of a romance between Bob and Charlotte, film historian Wendy Haslem argues that "Coppola's intention with this opening shot appears to be to defy taboos and to undermine expectations surrounding what might be considered the 'money shot' in more traditionally exploitative cinema." Correspondingly, the academic Maria San Filippo maintains that "[Coppola] doesn't seem to be making a statement at all beyond a sort of endorsement of beauty for beauty's sake." King notes that the image contains both "subtle" and "obvious" appeal in its combination of aesthetic and erotic qualities, which signifies Lost in Translations position between mainstream and independent film. The film scholar Todd Kennedy interprets it in terms of feminist film theorist Laura Mulvey's conception of the male gaze, arguing that the shot "lasts so long as to become awkward—forcing the audience to become aware of (and potentially even question) their participation in the gaze."

Lost in Translation has also been noted for defying the conventions of mainstream romantic films. Haslem writes that the classic romantic comedy assures the audience that the couple has a future, but Coppola defies expectations by refusing to unite the central characters. She points to elements such as Bob and Charlotte's lack of sexual consummation as one factor that obscures whether their pairing is more romantic or platonic. Writing about the concluding sequence in which the characters make their final goodbyes, Haslem argues, "Conventionally in mainstream cinema, the kiss... signifies resolution by reinforcing the myth of romantic love. But in this new wave of contemporary anti-romance romance, the kiss signifies ambiguity." The academic Nicholas Y.B. Wong contends that the film's lack of "heart-melting connections and melodramatic (re)unions between characters" represents a postmodern portrait of love, writing that Lost in Translation is "about non-love, the predominance of affairs and the complexities of intimacy. Characters vacillate between falling in love and out of love. They are neither committed to someone nor emotionally unattached." Coppola said Bob and Charlotte's relationship is "supposed to be romantic but on the edge.... [A] little bit more than friends but not an actual romance.... To me, it's pretty un-sexual between them—innocent and romantic, and a friendship."

Production

Writing

After dropping out of college in her early twenties, Coppola often traveled to Tokyo, trying out a variety of jobs in fashion and photography. Unsure of what to do for a career, she described this period as a "kind of crisis" in which she meandered around the city contemplating her future. She came to feel fond of Tokyo, noting an otherworldly quality brought on as a foreigner grappling with feelings of jet lag in an unfamiliar setting. After many years, she settled on a career in filmmaking and returned to the city, staying at the Park Hyatt Tokyo to promote her first feature film, the 1999 drama The Virgin Suicides.

Coppola began writing Lost in Translation after returning home from this press tour. Having been influenced by her background in Tokyo, she resolved to write a screenplay set there and began forming a story about two characters experiencing a "romantic melancholy" in the Park Hyatt Tokyo. Coppola was long attracted to the neon signs of the city and envisaged Tokyo taking on a "dreamy feeling" in the film. She recruited her friend Brian Reitzell, who ultimately served as the film's music producer, to create dream pop compilation mixes that she listened to while writing to help establish this mood.

Coppola did not initially write the screenplay in traditional script form, citing the difficulty of mapping out a full plot. Instead, she opted to write "little paragraphs" largely based on disparate impressions and experiences of her life in Tokyo, which she then adapted to a script. Among the first images she included was of her friend Fumihiro Hayashi performing a karaoke rendition of the Sex Pistols' "God Save the Queen", which Coppola saw him perform during the time she worked in Tokyo. After writing the first 20 pages with help from her brother, Roman Coppola, she returned to Tokyo for further inspiration. There, she videotaped anything she could use as a further writing aid.

Coppola envisioned Murray playing the role of Bob from the beginning, wanting to show off "his more sensitive side" and feeling amused by the image of him dressed in a kimono. She described her mental pictures of Murray as a significant source of inspiration for the story. For the character of Charlotte, Coppola drew from her own feelings of early-twenties disorientation, citing the strain in her relationship with her then-husband Spike Jonze as an influence for the relationship between Charlotte and John. She also drew inspiration from J. D. Salinger's character Franny in Franny and Zooey, finding appeal in "the idea of a preppy girl having a breakdown".

As she developed the relationship between Bob and Charlotte, Coppola was compelled by the juxtaposition of the characters having similar internal crises at different stages of their lives. She cited the dynamic between Humphrey Bogart and Lauren Bacall in The Big Sleep as a source of inspiration for their relationship. Coppola reported doing little re-writing of the script, which took six months to complete and culminated in 75 pages, much shorter than the average feature film script. Despite worrying that the screenplay was too short and "indulgent" for including assortments of her personal experiences, she resolved to begin production of the film.

Development

Coppola maintained that she would not have made Lost in Translation without Murray. The actor had an 800 number for prospective clients interested in casting him, but he had a reputation as a recluse who was difficult to contact. Coppola relentlessly pursued him and sent telephone messages and letters for months. She also sought people in her professional network that might help her make contact. She recruited screenwriter Mitch Glazer, who was a longtime friend of Murray's, to accept an early version of the script and try to persuade him. Glazer was impressed with the story and said he called the actor frequently, telling him, "You need to read this", but he would not provide an answer. After up to a year of cajoling, Murray finally agreed to meet with Coppola at a restaurant to discuss the film. He then accepted the role, saying "she spent a lot of time getting me to be the guy. In the end, I felt I couldn't let her down."

Despite Murray's agreement, Coppola had to take him at his word, as he did not sign a formal contract. She described this as "nerve-wracking", wondering if he would show up for filming in Tokyo. She discussed the issue with director Wes Anderson, who had previously worked with the actor and encouraged her, saying, "If he says he's going to do it, he'll show up." For Murray's co-star, Coppola liked Johansson's performance in Manny & Lo, remembering her "as a cute little girl with that husky voice". She then invited Johansson to a restaurant to discuss the role. Initially worried that the 17-year-old Johansson might be too young to play a character in her twenties, the director concluded that she appeared older and could convincingly play the part. Coppola offered Johansson the role without an audition, which she accepted.

Feeling a sense of personal investment in the project, Coppola wanted to maintain final cut privilege and feared that a distribution deal with a North American studio would threaten her influence. It was also unlikely that a studio would provide such backing, given the short length of the screenplay and Murray's lack of formal involvement. Instead, she and her agent opted to sell foreign distribution rights to an assortment of companies to fund production costs of $4 million. She struck a deal first with Japan's Tohokushinsha Film, then with distributors in France and Italy, and finally with the international arm of Focus Features for the remaining foreign market. By piecing together the funding from multiple distributors, Coppola reduced the influence of any single financier. Still not knowing if Murray would show up in Tokyo, Coppola spent $1 million of the budget, knowing that his absence would doom the production. When he finally arrived, days before filming, she expressed significant relief.

Filming

Principal photography began on September 29, 2002, and lasted 27 days. With a tight schedule and a limited $4 million budget, filming was done six days per week and was marked by a "run-and-gun" approach: Coppola was keen to stay mobile with a small crew and minimal equipment. She conducted few rehearsals and kept a flexible schedule, sometimes scrapping filming plans to shoot something she noticed on location if she thought it better served the story. Since the screenplay was sparse, missing details were often addressed during shooting, and Coppola allowed a significant amount of improvisation in dialogue, especially from Murray. One example includes the scene in which Bob is being photographed for Suntory whisky; Coppola encouraged Murray to react to the photographer spontaneously as she whispered names for the man to repeat to Murray as unrehearsed dialogue, such as "Roger Moore".

While key crew members were Americans that Coppola invited to Tokyo, most of the crew was hired locally. This proved to be challenging for the production, as most of the Japanese crew could not communicate with Coppola in English, so both sides relied on translations from a bilingual assistant director and a gaffer. The production encountered frequent delays while translations took place and suffered from occasional cultural misunderstandings; in one example, Coppola described a shoot in a restaurant that ran 10–15 minutes late, something she said was normal on an American shoot, but it prompted the restaurant owner to feel disrespected; he subsequently disconnected the crew's lights and the film's Japanese location manager resigned. Despite this, Coppola said she worked to adapt to a Japanese style of filmmaking, not wanting to impose an approach that her crew was not used to.

Coppola worked closely to visualize the film with her director of photography, Lance Acord. She showed him and other key crew members a book of photographs she created that represented the visual style she wanted to convey in the film. To evoke a sense of isolation in Bob, Coppola and Acord used stationary shots in the hotel and avoided conspicuous camera movements. They also had numerous discussions about shooting on video, but they ultimately decided that film better suited the romantic undertones of the story. Coppola remarked, "Film gives a little bit of a distance, which feels more like a memory to me. Video is more present tense". Acord believed that new film stocks would reduce the need for excessive lighting, ultimately using Kodak Vision 500T 5263 35 mm stock for night exteriors and Kodak Vision 320T 5277 stock in daylight. Most of the film was shot on an Aaton 35-III while a smaller Moviecam Compact was used in confined locations.

With high-speed film stocks, Acord chose to utilize available light as often as possible, only supplementing with artificial lights when necessary. He reported "never really" rigging lights for night exteriors, relying on the natural light on Tokyo's city streets. For interior sequences in the Park Hyatt Tokyo, he relied mostly on the hotel's practical lighting sources, shooting at a wide open f-stop and heavily cutting the light to eliminate reflections in the hotel window. Acord said he heard objections about lighting from some of the Japanese electricians, who were unaccustomed to relying so much on available light and were concerned that the exposure would not be sufficient. Acord, assured that the film stocks would hold up against lower lighting, ultimately shot much of the film two stops underexposed.

Many of the shooting locations were Japanese places of business and public areas at the time of filming, including New York Bar in the Park Hyatt Tokyo and Shibuya Crossing in Tokyo. On public streets and subways, the production did not secure filming permits and relied on city bystanders as extras; Coppola described the shooting as "documentary-style" and was worried at times about getting stopped by police, so she kept a minimal crew. In the hotel, the production was not allowed to shoot in public areas until 1 or 2 a.m. to avoid disturbing guests. In the film's concluding sequence in which Bob and Charlotte make their final goodbyes, Coppola reported being unhappy with the dialogue she had scripted, so Murray improvised the whisper in Johansson's ear. Too quiet to be understandable, Coppola considered dubbing audio in the scene, but she ultimately decided it was better that it "stays between the two of them". After production concluded, Coppola supervised 10 weeks of editing by Sarah Flack in New York City.

Soundtrack

The film's soundtrack was released by Emperor Norton Records on September 9, 2003. It contains 15 tracks, largely from the shoegaze and dream pop genres of indie and alternative rock. The soundtrack was supervised by Brian Reitzell and contains songs from artists and groups including Death in Vegas, Phoenix, Squarepusher, Sébastien Tellier, and Happy End. The Jesus and Mary Chain's song "Just Like Honey" and "Sometimes" by My Bloody Valentine featured, and four original tracks were written for Lost in Translation by the latter band's frontman, Kevin Shields. Other tracks produced for the film include two co-written by Reitzell and Roger Joseph Manning Jr., and one by Air. Songs featured in the film that are not in the soundtrack include karaoke performances of Elvis Costello's cover of "(What's So Funny 'Bout) Peace, Love, and Understanding" and The Pretenders' "Brass in Pocket". A further performance by Murray of Roxy Music's "More Than This" is included as a bonus track.

During the screenwriting stage, Coppola spoke to Reitzell about the "moody" and "melancholic" qualities she wanted the music to convey in the film, as well as what Reitzell understood to be the "strange, floating, jet-lagged weirdness" that would define the central characters. Coppola said she wanted the soundtrack "to be less like a score" and more like the dream-pop mixes Reitzell made to assist her writing of the film. While Shields had released little music since the release of Loveless in 1991, at Reitzell's suggestion, he and Coppola enlisted him to help write original music for the film; Reitzell believed Shields "could capture that droning, swaying, beautiful kind of feeling that we wanted." He then joined Shields in London for some two months of overnight recording sessions, and they used the screenplay and dailies from production as inspiration while they worked on songs for the film. Shields commented on the challenge he felt in songwriting for a film, saying "I was barely aware of the language of music that's not essentially just for your ears. ... In the end, just the physical movement of the film, that was a delicacy. And I suppose that's why I ended up doing stuff that was so delicate."

King argues that music often plays the most significant role in setting mood and tone in the film, writing that it is substantial "in evoking the dreamy, narcotised, semi-detached impressions of jet-lag" as well as broader feelings of alienation and disconnection, "making what is probably the largest single contribution to the widespread understanding of the film as a 'mood piece'." He points to the use of "Girls" by Death in Vegas, featured in the early sequence in which Bob is driven from the airport to the hotel, arguing that it "plays a role equal to if not dominating that of the visuals..., creating a drifting, ethereal and somewhat dreamy quality that precisely captures the impressions of temporal and spatial disjunction". He also points to the use of "cool and distant" tracks like "Tommib", used in the extended sequence featuring Charlotte observing Tokyo while seated in her hotel room window, as playing a significant role in establishing feelings of isolation and disorientation in the character. In King's view, some sequences feature combinations of music and visuals so as to function as "audio-visual set pieces", which offer distinct points of appeal in the film for its target audience.

Release

Marketing
Coppola did not sell distribution rights for the United States and Canada until she and Flack finished editing the film. In February 2003, the director showed the film to top executives at the domestic arm of Focus Features, the company to which it had already sold most of the foreign distribution. The prior contract proved to be significant for Focus, as it received privileged access to the film while competing buyers complained that they were restricted to the viewing of a three-minute trailer in the Focus offices at the American Film Market. Coppola initially offered the domestic distribution rights for $5 million, but she decided to sell them to Focus for $4 million, citing her appreciation for the international deals the company had secured for the film.

Once Focus was involved, it began promoting the film by employing a conventional "indie-style" marketing campaign. The strategy involved generating positive word of mouth for the film well before its September 2003 release. The distributor arranged advance press screenings throughout the summer of 2003 and combined this with a magazine publicity campaign. Posters and trailers emphasized the recognizable star presence of Murray, highlighting his performance in the film's comic sequences, which favored wider audience appeal. Immediately prior to its release, Focus placed Lost in Translation in film festivals and hosted "intimate media screenings" that included question-and-answer panels with Coppola and Murray. Many of these marketing tacks were designed to promote the film at minimal cost, a departure from more costly strategies often employed in the Hollywood mainstream, such as major television advertising.

Theatrical run
Lost in Translation had its premiere on August 29, 2003, at the Telluride Film Festival in the United States. Two days later, it appeared at the Venice Film Festival in Italy, and on September 5, 2003, it was shown at the Toronto International Film Festival in Canada. It opened to the public in limited release on September 12, 2003, at 23 theaters in major cities in the United States, including New York City, Los Angeles, and San Francisco. The film had already generated speculation about Oscar contention from advance screenings and was noted for opening several weeks earlier than expected for an indie vying for awards—a risk being that opening too early might cause the film to be forgotten by the time nominations were made for major prizes like the Academy Awards. Focus Features co-presidents James Schamus and David Linde commented that the company chose an early release date on the basis of factors including the film's quality and early marketing campaign, as well as a lack of competition from other films. The strategy was intended to give Lost in Translation more time to command the marketplace.

The film grossed $925,000 in its opening weekend and was expanded the next week from 23 theaters to 183 in the top 25 markets of the country. There, it grossed more than $2.62 million over the weekend and nearly paid off the total budget of the film. It entered wide release on October 3, its fourth weekend, peaking at a rank of seven in the box office chart; a week later, it expanded to an estimated 882 theaters, the film's highest theater count over its run. Lost in Translation grossed an estimated to-date total of $18.5 million through October 13 and was noted by The Hollywood Reporter to have been performing well even "in smaller and medium-sized markets where audiences don't always respond to this type of upscale material". Following this performance, Lost in Translation saw a gradual decline in theater presence progressing into the new year, though it was expanded again after the film received nominations for the 76th Academy Awards. The film was widened from a late December low of 117 theaters to an estimated 632 at the end of January, ultimately ending its run in the United States and Canada on March 25 and earning $44.6 million. Its international release earned $74.1 million, for a worldwide total of $118.7 million.

Home media
The DVD of Lost in Translation was released on February 3, 2004, and includes deleted scenes, a behind-the-scenes featurette, a conversation about the film featuring Murray and Coppola, and a music video for "City Girl", one of the original songs composed for the film by Kevin Shields. Wanting to capitalize on the publicity surrounding Lost in Translations presence at the Academy Awards, Focus Features made the unusual move of releasing the film on home media while it was still screening in theaters, immediately after its Oscar nominations were announced. The strategy was seen as risky, as the industry was generally concerned that theatrical revenues could be harmed by early home video release. Lost in Translation ultimately earned nearly $5 million from its first five days of video rentals and sold one million retail copies during its first week of release. Early returns showed it was the second-best selling DVD during this period while the film screened in 600 theaters and box office revenues dropped 19% from the previous week, which Variety described as "relatively modest". Focus credited the performance to positive word of mouth and cited the marketing for the film on both media as helpful for whichever platform consumers chose. 

Lost in Translation was later released on the now-obsolete HD DVD format on May 29, 2007, and on Blu-ray on December 7, 2010.

Reception

Critical response
Lost in Translation received widespread critical acclaim, particularly for Murray's performance and for Coppola's direction and screenplay. On Rotten Tomatoes, the film has an approval rating of 95% based on 232 reviews, with an average rating of 8.4/10. The site's critical consensus reads, "Effectively balancing humor and subtle pathos, Sofia Coppola crafts a moving, melancholy story that serves as a showcase for both Bill Murray and Scarlett Johansson." On Metacritic, which assigns a normalized rating to reviews, the film has an average score of 89 out of 100 based on 44 reviews, indicating "universal acclaim".

Critics widely praised Murray's performance as Bob, commending his handling of a more serious role that was combined with the comic persona for which he was already broadly known. Writing for Slate, David Edelstein argued that it was "the Bill Murray performance we've been waiting for", adding that "his two halves have never come together as they do here, in a way that connects that hilarious detachment with the deep and abiding sense of isolation that must have spawned it". Lisa Schwarzbaum of Entertainment Weekly regarded Murray's performance as Oscar-worthy and lauded it as his "most vulnerable and unmannered" to date; she praised his treatment of a more delicate role as well as his improvisations in the film's comic sequences. The New York Times critic Elvis Mitchell had similar praise, calling Lost in Translation "Mr. Murray's movie" and remarking that the actor "supplies the kind of performance that seems so fully realized and effortless that it can easily be mistaken for not acting at all".

Coppola received a similar level of acclaim for her screenplay and direction. Kenneth Turan of the Los Angeles Times commented that Lost in Translation was "tart and sweet, unmistakably funny and exceptionally well observed—[which] marks... Coppola as a mature talent with a distinctive sensibility and the means to express it". Much of the praise was directed specifically at her attention to qualities of subtlety and atmosphere; David Rooney of Variety praised the film as "a mood piece", adding that its "deft balance of humor and poignancy makes it both a pleasurable and melancholy experience". Likewise, Salon critic Stephanie Zacharek lauded Coppola as a "stealth dramatist" whose understated narrative style made for an artful depiction of emotion; she praised Lost in Translation as an intimate story that marks Coppola as an exceptional filmmaker.

Praise was also offered for Johansson's performance as Charlotte; Rooney commented that she "gives a smartly restrained performance as an observant, questioning woman with a rich interior life", and Turan added that Johansson "makes what could have been an overly familiar characterization come completely alive". Lost in Translation was listed as a best film of the year by more than 235 critics and has appeared on other "best of" lists in the years after its release. Paste ranked it number seven on its list of "The 50 Best Movies of the 2000s", Entertainment Weekly ranked it number nine on its list of the decade's top ten, and the film was ranked number 22 on a 2016 list of the BBC's 100 Greatest Films of the 21st Century, based on a poll of 177 critics.

Controversy
While not a topic of most reviews, Lost in Translation received some charges of Orientalist racial stereotyping in its depiction of Japan. The filmmaker E. Koohan Paik argued that the film's comedy "is rooted entirely in the 'otherness' of the Japanese people", and that the story fails to offer balanced characterizations of the Japanese, adding that "it is... the shirking of responsibility to depict them as full human beings, either negative or positive, which constitutes discrimination, or racism". Similarly, the artist Kiku Day charged in The Guardian that "[t]here is no scene where the Japanese are afforded a shred of dignity. The viewer is sledgehammered into laughing at these small, yellow people and their funny ways". Prior to the film's release in Japan, local distributors were reported to have concern about how it would be received there, and the film was ultimately met with criticism in some Japanese reviews; among them, critic Yoshiro Tsuchiya of Yomiuri Shimbun wrote that Coppola's representation of Japan was "outrageously biased and banal". Perceptions of stereotyping also led to a campaign against the film by an Asian American organization that urged members of the Academy of Motion Picture Arts and Sciences to vote against it at the 76th Academy Awards.

The film scholar Homay King argues that while the film ultimately does little to counter Orientalist stereotypes, it fails to establish the perspective from which Japanese representations are made, writing that "the film [does not] sufficiently clarify that its real subject is not Tokyo itself, but Western perceptions of Tokyo.... When Japan appears superficial, inappropriately erotic, or unintelligible, we are never completely sure whether this vision belongs to Coppola, to her characters, or simply to a Hollywood cinematic imaginary". Moreover, Geoff King maintains that while depictions such as Charlotte's alienation from experiences like ikebana are evidence that the film abstains from the Orientalist "mythology of Japanese tradition as source of solace", the film often situates Japan as a source of "difference" for the characters by relying on crude jokes and stereotypes of the Japanese as "crazy" or "extreme". Coppola reported being surprised by such criticism, saying, "I think if everything's based on truth you can make fun, have a little laugh, but also be respectful of a culture. I just love Tokyo and I'm not mean-spirited".

Accolades

Lost in Translation received awards and nominations in a variety of categories, particularly for Coppola's direction and screenwriting, as well as the performances of Murray and Johansson. At the 76th Academy Awards, it won Best Original Screenplay (Coppola) and the film received three further nominations for Best Picture, Best Director (Coppola), and Best Actor (Murray). The film garnered three Golden Globe Awards from five nominations: Best Motion Picture – Musical or Comedy, Best Actor – Motion Picture Musical or Comedy, and Best Screenplay. At the 57th British Academy Film Awards, Lost in Translation won three awards: Best Actor in a Leading Role, Best Actress in a Leading Role (Johansson), and Best Editing.

Lost in Translation also received awards from various foreign award ceremonies, film festivals, and critics' organizations. These include Best American Film at the Bodil Awards, Best Foreign Film at the César Awards, and Best Foreign Film at the Film Critics Circle of Australia, French Syndicate of Cinema Critics, and Deutscher Filmpreis, as well as the Nastro d'Argento for Best Foreign Director. The film also won the Independent Spirit Award for Best Film, Best Film – Comedy or Musical at the Satellite Awards, and two prizes at the Venice International Film Festival. From critics' organizations, Lost in Translation received awards in the Best Film category from the San Francisco Film Critics Circle, the Toronto Film Critics Association, and the Vancouver Film Critics Circle.

References

Annotations

Footnotes

Bibliography

External links

 
 
 
 

2003 films
2003 independent films
2003 romantic comedy-drama films
2000s American films
2000s English-language films
2000s Japanese films
American independent films
American Zoetrope films
American romantic comedy-drama films
BAFTA winners (films)
Best Foreign Film César Award winners
Best Musical or Comedy Picture Golden Globe winners
English-language Japanese films
Film controversies in Japan
Films about actors
Films about interpreting and translation
Films directed by Sofia Coppola
Films featuring a Best Musical or Comedy Actor Golden Globe winning performance
Films set in hotels
Films set in Kyoto
Films set in Tokyo
Films shot in Kyoto Prefecture
Films shot in Tokyo
Films whose writer won the Best Original Screenplay Academy Award
Films with screenplays by Sofia Coppola
Focus Features films
Independent Spirit Award for Best Film winners
Japan in non-Japanese culture
Japanese independent films
Japanese romantic comedy-drama films
Midlife crisis films
Race-related controversies in film